The Great Wall Coolbear is a subcompact car designed with a high seating position. Its competitors include Kia Soul, Scion xB, and Nissan Cube.

Design
The Coolbear's design is a copy of many Scion models.
The side and rear is similar to a first generation Scion xB, and the front is also a close copy of the Scion t2B concept car. The Coolbear comes in with choice of three engines starting from the 1.2 litre diesel; and 1.3 litre, and 1.5 litre gasoline engine.

Great Wall Haval M2
The Great Wall Haval M2 is the lifted crossover version of the Great Wall Coolbear. It was launched after a few years and was marketed under the Haval sub-brand.

References

Front-wheel-drive vehicles
Coolbear
2000s cars
2010s cars
Cars of China